Gutiérrez (Cordillera) is a small town in the Santa Cruz Department of Bolivia.

Populated places in Santa Cruz Department (Bolivia)